Świerklany Dolne is a village in the administrative district of Gmina Świerklany, within Rybnik County, Silesian Voivodeship, in southern Poland.

The village has a population of 3,300.

The village was first mentioned in a Latin document of Diocese of Wrocław called Liber fundationis episcopatus Vratislaviensis from around 1305 as item in Swrklant debent esse XXIII) mansi.

References

External links 
 Jewish Community in Świerklany Dolne on Virtual Shtetl

Villages in Rybnik County